Phaeton, Phaëton, Phaethon, Phæton, or Phaëthon may refer to:

Art 
 Phaëton (Lully), tragédie lyrique by Jean Baptiste Lully
 Phaethon (composition), 1986 composition by Christopher Rouse
 The Fall of Phaeton (Rubens), a painting by Peter Paul Rubens
 Phaethon, a lost play by Euripides

Astronomy 
 3200 Phaethon, small asteroid or comet responsible for the Geminids meteor shower
 Phaeton (hypothetical planet), a hypothetical fifth planet believed to have once existed between the orbits of Mars and Jupiter and whose destruction supposedly led to the formation of the asteroid belt
 Phaethontis quadrangle, a region on Mars

Biology 
Phaethon, genus name of the three tropicbird species

Greek mythology 
 Phaethon, son of Helios, personification of the Sun
 Phaethon, guardian of the temples of Aphrodite
 Phaethon (horse), one of the horses of Eos

People 
 Phaethon, first king of the Bronze Age Molossians

Physics 
 Dark photon, also called phaeton, a hypothetical dark matter particle

Places 
 Phaeton, Nord-Est, a town in Haiti

Vehicles 
 Phaeton body, a style of open carriage or automobile
 Phaeton (carriage), a horse-drawn sporty open carriage
 Volkswagen Phaeton, a full-size luxury automobile built by Volkswagen until 2016
 Cadillac Phaeton, a full-size automobile built by Cadillac 1930-1940. 
 Ford Phaeton, a 2-doors or 4-doors automobile built by Ford 1928-1932.
 Phaethon (patrol boat), a patrol boat of the Navy of Cyprus
 Double Phaeton, a Gräf & Stift luxury automobile c. 1910.
 HMS Phaeton (1782), a frigate of Britain's Royal Navy.